The Japanese destroyer {{nihongo|Oite|追風|"Tail Wind"}} was one of nine  destroyers built for the Imperial Japanese Navy during the 1920s.During the Pacific War, she participated in the Battle of Wake Island in December 1941 and the occupations of New Guinea and the Solomon Islands in early 1942.

Design and description
The Kamikaze class was an improved version of the s. They were powered by two Parsons geared steam turbines, each driving one propeller shaft, using steam provided by four Kampon water-tube boilers. During sea trials, the ships comfortably exceeded their designed speeds, reaching . Their crew consisted of 148 officers and crewmen.

The main armament of the Kamikaze-class ships consisted of four  Type 3 guns in single mounts; one gun forward of the superstructure, one between the two funnels and the last pair back to back atop the aft superstructure. The guns were numbered '1' to '4' from front to rear. The ships carried three above-water twin sets of  torpedo tubes; one mount was between the forward superstructure and the forward gun and the other two were between the aft funnel and aft superstructure.

Early in the war, the No. 4 gun and the aft torpedo tubes were removed in exchange for four depth charge throwers and 18 depth charges. In addition 10 license-built  Type 96 light AA guns were installed. Survivors had their light AA armament augmented to be between thirteen and twenty 25 mm guns and four  Type 93 anti-aircraft machineguns by June 1944.

Construction and career
Oite was laid down by the Uraga Dock Company at its shipyard in Uraga on 16 March 1923, launched on 27 November 1924 and completed on 30 October 1925. Originally commissioned simply as Destroyer No. 11, the ship was assigned the name Oite on 1 August 1928.

Pacific War
At the time of the attack on Pearl Harbor on 7 December 1941, Oite was the flagship of Destroyer Division 29 under Destroyer Squadron 6 of the 4th Fleet. She sortied from Kwajalein on 8 December as part of the Wake Island invasion force.

As none of the six American  coast-defense guns replied, Rear Admiral Sadamichi Kajioka, commander of the invasion forces, ordered his ships to close the island, believing that the American guns had been destroyed by the earlier aerial attacks. Encouraging this, Major James Devereux, commander of the United States Marine garrison, had ordered his men to hold their fire until he gave the order to do so. They did so with great effect, sinking Hayate, near-missing Kajioka's flagship Yubari, and causing to him to order his forces to disengage. Oite was slightly damaged by near-misses that also wounded 14 crewmen. The ship returned on 23 December with the second (and ultimately successful) Wake Island invasion force before returning to Kwajalein.

From January through March 1942, Oite provided cover for Japanese forces during Operation R (the invasion of Rabaul, New Britain) and Operation SR (the invasion of Lae and Salamaua), returning to Sasebo Naval Arsenal for repairs in April. In late April, Oite escorted a convoy from Sasebo to Truk. During the Battle of the Coral Sea from 7–8 May 1942, Oite was assigned to the Operation Mo invasion force for Port Moresby in New Guinea. When that operation was cancelled, she was reassigned to the Solomon Islands sector, patrolling from Rabaul and escorting an airfield construction crew from Truk to Bougainville and Guadalcanal. In August 1942, Oite made a "Tokyo Express" troop transport run to Guadalcanal, but at the end of the month was reassigned to cover troop landings on Nauru and Ocean Island during Operation RY.

In September 1942, Oite made patrols in the central Pacific, and escorted troop convoys from Palau to the Solomons through September 1943. Oite was struck by a torpedo on 21 September 1943, while escorting a convoy from Truk, via Saipan to Yokosuka, but the torpedo was a dud and did only minor damage. Oite continued in the escort role through February 1944 between the Japanese home islands and Saipan, and between Saipan and Rabaul, with increasing losses to American submarines.

On 16 February 1944 Oite was escorting the damaged cruiser  to Japan from Truk when Agano was torpedoed and sunk by the United States Navy submarine .  Oite rescued 523 of Aganos crew and turned back towards Truk. However, just as Oite was entering Truk harbor on 18 February, the Japanese base was struck by United States Navy aircraft in Operation Hailstone. Oite was torpedoed, broke in half and sank almost immediately with loss of 172 of 192 crewmen and all 523 survivors of Agano. Oite was struck from the Navy List on 31 March 1944.

The bow section is upside down, with the bridge buried in mud; the afterpart lies on the bottom upright.

Notes

References

 

 

Kamikaze-class destroyers (1922)
Ships built by Uraga Dock Company
1924 ships
World War II destroyers of Japan
Destroyers sunk by aircraft
World War II shipwrecks in the Pacific Ocean
Maritime incidents in February 1944
Shipwrecks of Truk Lagoon
Ships sunk by US aircraft
Wreck diving sites
Underwater diving sites in Micronesia